Edison Park is a park located in Edison Park community in Chicago, Illinois.

The park became part of the Chicago Park District in 1936. Edison Park's historic fieldhouse was built in 1907 as a public school. The fieldhouse was designed by Solon Spencer Beman in the Arts and Crafts style. A branch of the Chicago Public Library operated out of the fieldhouse from 1937 to 1960, and the building has also served as a community center.

The park contains hawthorn trees planted in the 1930s as well as a historic flagpole. In addition, the park contains a playground added in 1988, and a boulder honoring Thomas Edison dedicated in 1979. The park was added to the National Register of Historic Places on September 21, 2007.

References

Parks in Chicago
North Side, Chicago
Parks on the National Register of Historic Places in Chicago
Arts and Crafts architecture in Illinois
Historic districts on the National Register of Historic Places in Illinois
1936 establishments in Illinois